Mota Mindha is a small village in Una Taluka of Gir Somnath district in the Indian state of Gujarat with only 61 people resident. The main occupation of the people of this village is agriculture, farming and animal husbandry. In the village mainly crops like wheat, millet, cotton, groundnut, sugarcane, rajakas and other vegetables are cultivated. In this village, facilities like primary school, panchayat, anganwadi and milk dairy are available.

References

Villages in Gir Somnath district